Thiago Cruz Reggiani (born 15 July 1981) is a football former striker.

He was the director of football of Australian club Brisbane Roar during the 2010–11 A-League season when the club won its first ever Premiership and Championship after a season which saw them go undefeated in 28 games, including the Grand Final. With that feat, they won automatic entry into the 2012 AFC Champions League.

At the beginning of the 2012, Thiago Cruz returns to Brazil and takes over the position of Director of Football of Brazilian football club Ituano, which has former Brazilian international Juninho Paulista as current club owner. In 2014, Ituano wins the Campeonato Paulista, defeating Santos Futebol Clube on penalty kicks.

In May 2016, Thiago Cruz took a position as Head of Academy Recruitment Operations for English club Middlesbrough.

References

Living people
1981 births
Brazilian footballers
Brazilian expatriate footballers
Association football forwards
Footballers from São Paulo